The Great Mosque of Xi'an is one of the largest premodern mosques in China. Although the mosque was first built in the year 742 AD during the Tang dynasty, its current form was largely constructed in 1384 AD during Emperor Hongwu's reign of the Ming dynasty, as recorded by the Records of Xi'an Municipality.

An active place of worship within Xi'an Muslim Quarter, this courtyard complex is also a popular tourist site. It now houses more than twenty buildings in its five courtyards, and covers 1.23 hectares.

Etymology and location within Xi'an

The mosque is also known as the Huajue Xiang Mosque, for its location on 30 Huajue Lane. It is sometimes called the Great Eastern Mosque as well, because it is located in the eastern segments of the Xi'an Muslim Quarter. The Daxuexi Alley Mosque sits on the other side of the Muslim Quarter and is known as the "Western Mosque" of Xi'an.

History and usage

Original mosque during the Tang and Song dynasties 
Chang'an, as the cosmopolitan capital of China's Tang dynasty, had sizable non-Han merchant and artisan communities that resided there. Many of them migrated to China from today's West Asia. Emperor Xuanzong decreed around the year 742 AD (as Tangmingsi) that a place of worship for the Muslim community was to be constructed in the city. It has been argued that, around the same time, mosques for the immigrant population in Quanzhou and Guangzhou were being built. There is evidence that the early mosque was used during the Song dynasty due to the presence of an imperial plaque placed in the mosque issued by the Song government.

Due to the collapse of the Tang dynasty and later the Song dynasty, most parts of the original mosque constructed in the Tang dynasty did not survive. The mosque was reconstructed at least four times before taking its modern shape. At around the 1260s, the then deteriorating mosque was rebuilt by the Yuan government as Huihui Wanshansi. 

The Mongol conquest of China witnessed a large immigration of Muslims into China. Many were relocated by the Mongol Yuan rulers to serve as bureaucrats and merchants in China. The foreign, often Muslim, population brought into China by the Mongol regime were known in Chinese as People with Coloured Eyes, many of whom originated from the recently Islamized regions such as Kara-Khanid Xinjiang and Persia. Despite moving into and permanently settling in China, many of the Muslim immigrants and their descendants did not give up their Islamic faith nor "foreign" identity. Many of these new Chinese residents intermarried with the local Han population, forming and consolidating the foundations of the genetically diverse ethnic Hui population in China.

Reconstruction during the Ming dynasty 
The city of Xi'an, after being destroyed during the collapse of the Tang dynasty, was reconstructed during the Ming dynasty by 1378 AD. The reconstruction of the original mosque into its contemporary form was patronized by the imperial government during Emperor Hongwu's reign. The mosque witnessed further additions during the Qing dynasty, which included the mosque's front gate, Paifang, and Sebil. Evidence of official patronage of the mosque is present in the form of plaques placed in the Mosque. For instance, a plaque stating the Declaration of the Reconstruction of the Mosque was placed there in 1606 during the Ming dynasty. Another plaque called Declaration to Fix the Mosque was placed there by the Qing government in 1768.

It has been widely argued that although the Hui community largely adhered to their religious identity, they gravitated and later adopted the mainstream Han Chinese cultural traditions as encouraged by the Ming and later Qing governments. However, certain restrictions on the practice of Islam occurred after the Dungan Revolt (1862–1877), which started because of ethnic and religious tensions between the Muslims and the Han Chinese. The revolt led to riots and mass killing from both sides. After the Dungan Revolt the Qing government limited Muslim freedom of worship. The ritual slaughtering of animals was forbidden. The construction new mosques and the pilgrimage to Mecca were prohibited, though these restrictions were lifted after the overthrowing of the Qing dynasty. Today, the Great Mosque of Xi'an and its surrounding area have been developed as the center of the Hui population of Xi'an.

In 1956, the government of the People's Republic of China declared the mosque to be a Historical and Cultural Site Protected at the Shaanxi Province Level. However, during the Cultural Revolution, as with practically all other religious facilities in mainland China, the mosque was temporarily shut down and converted into a steel factory. Following Mao Zedong's death in 1976, religious activities resumed, and the mosque was later promoted to a Major Historical and Cultural Site Protected at the National Level in 1988. In 1997, it was selected as one of the top 10 tourist attractions in Xi'an.

Modern usage 
Today, the mosque is used as a place of worship by Chinese Muslims, primarily the Hui people. The Great Mosque of Xi'an represents the Gedimu tradition of Sunni Islam with the Hanafi jurisdiction, which is the majority jurisprudence that the Hui population follow. The main prayer hall of the Great Mosque of Xi’an can accommodate 1,000 people though around 100 worshippers attend a typical Friday service today. Visitors and tourists can pay a small fee to enter and complex and see the gardens and steles but non-Muslim are not allowed to enter the prayer hall.

The mosque standing today is not only a religious site to the Muslims in the city, but a cultural heritage site to all citizens of Xi'an. It is used to represent the ethnic and religious diversity that the city had in the past.

Architecture
The Great Mosque of Xi'an is an example of the adaptability of mosque architecture in the context of Chinese culture. The mosque has features that mosque around the world typically have, such as the qibla and mihrab, but it also contains Chinese architectural features and cultural symbols throughout.

A mosque in a Chinese style 
Overall, the mosque, like the majority of Chinese mosques built between the Ming and Qing periods, combines a traditional Chinese architectural form with Islamic functionality. Though the mosque was constructed using traditional Chinese forms, unlike most buildings that follow a north–south axis in accordance with feng shui (most Chinese religious buildings has its gates open in the north direction), the mosque is oriented toward west, the direction of Mecca. Calligraphy in both Chinese and Perso-Arabic script appears throughout the complex. The Arabic texts, such as the Shahada, can be seen written in the Sini calligraphic style, which is the style of Arabic calligraphy using Chinese-influenced medium, such as the usage of the Chinese ink brush for writing.

Courtyard 
The mosque is a walled complex of four courtyards, with the prayer hall located in the fourth and also the westmost courtyard. The first and second courtyards are mostly traditional Chinese gardens, while the third and fourth courtyards are where the main structures of the mosques are located. The courtyards are divided by walls and connected by gateways. Most of the architectural features present in the courtyards were constructed during or after the Ming dynasty. However, there are artefacts dating from earlier than the Ming dynasty, such as the plaques on the gates of the second courtyard, which were plaque carvings dated from the Song dynasty (see image above). Each courtyard contains a central monument, such as a gate, and is lined with greenery as well as subsidiary buildings.

Paifangs frame all the courtyards. They are imperially commissioned arches that commemorate those that have contributed to the state. Some scholars claim that the number of paifangs in the courtyard implies that the Muslim Hui community were treated as equal citizens, in the same way as Han citizens. The first courtyard, for instance, contains a Qing dynasty monumental gate, while the fourth courtyard houses the Phoenix Pavilion, a hexagonal gazebo. Walls throughout the complex are carved with plant and object motifs, and inscriptions in both Chinese and Arabic. Stone steles record repairs done to the mosque and feature calligraphic works. In the second courtyard, two steles display texts that promote ethnic harmony (for instance, as attached in the figure above, one of the steles draws upon prominent connections between the Islamic faith and Taoism), one of them supposedly featuring scripts of the calligrapher Mi Fu of the Song dynasty.

The Shengxinlou, or “Examining the Heart Tower,” is a three-story, octagonal pagoda in the third courtyard. The structure contains a number of steles dating to as early as the Tang dynasty. The presence of these, often large, steles have been used to support the Tang establishment of the mosque. Despite the usage of this complex as a mosque, the Great Mosque of Xi'an is notable for lacking a minaret. However, some scholars, such as Dr. Nancy Steinhardt from the University of Pennsylvania, speculate that the Xingxin Tower originally served as the mosque's minaret that was previously used for the call to prayer. This courtyard is for visitors to attend prayer services. Today the third courtyard is where many of the mosque community's daily activities take place. For instance, the mosque's central kitchen, the residential Imam's office, and other governmental administrative departments are located here.

The fourth courtyard has a bigger prayer hall that can seat more than a thousand people.

Prayer hall 
It is believed that the prayer hall was constructed during the Ming dynasty, although significant reconstructions occurred during the Qing era. This argument has been supported by the numerous wooden columns in the prayer hall as the use of wooden columns predates that of brick columns which were typical of Qing dynasty buildings. The prayer hall is a monumental timber building with a turquoise hip roof, painted dougong (wooden brackets), a six-pillared portico, and five doors. Contrary to most mosques in many Muslim-majority states, the prayer hall does not feature a dome-shaped ceiling but has a traditional Chinese, pointy ceiling covered with ceramic decorative tiles. Meanwhile, the prayer hall is decorated with images of plants and flowers, suggesting the decorative program still followed the Islamic tradition that forbids anthropomorphic imageries. The ceiling is raised upon a large stone platform lined with wooden balustrades. The expansive prayer hall consists of three conjoined buildings, set one behind the other. In the furthest part of the prayer hall stands the rear qibla wall, which has wooden carvings of floral and calligraphic designs.

Gallery

See also
 Islam in China
 Timeline of Islamic history
 List of the oldest mosques in the world
 List of famous mosques
 List of mosques in China

References

External links

Description of the Great Mosque of Xi'an
Asian Historical Architecture: Great Mosque
Huajuexiang Mosque in Xian (Masterpiece of Islamic Architecture)

Religious organizations established in the 8th century
Mosques in China
Religious buildings and structures in Xi'an
Ming dynasty architecture
Major National Historical and Cultural Sites in Shaanxi
Tourist attractions in Xi'an
Xi'an